Nikolay Georgievich Bagrayev is a Ukrainian businessman in the fields of media and show business and a public figure.

Personal life 
Nikolay Bagrayev was born on 19 June 1964, in the Digora village in North-Ossetian ASSR, Russia. His mother is Chabahan Bagrayeva (born 1927), and his father is Georgiy Bagrayev (born 1882), a farmer in Digora and a war veteran.

Nikolay Bagrayev is married to Svetlana Bagrayeva (born in 1966), a psychologist. They have a son, Ruslan (born in 1988), who graduated from Kyiv National Economic University with a degree from the International Economics and Management faculty. The pair also have a daughter, Lyudmila (born in 1990). She is also enrolled in the International Economics and Management faculty at Kyiv National Economic University.

Education 
 1987 - Kherson State Agrarian and Economic University, Faculty of Civil Engineering.
 2005 - Kyiv National Economic University, Faculty of International Economics, cum laude.

Career 
 1987-1988 - senior technical inspector, permanent buildings and facilities construction department, "Kherson Beauty."
 1988-1991 - Second and later First Secretary of Kakhovka city Komsomol Committee.
 1991-1992 - Chairman of the Youth Committee of Kakhovka municipality.
 1992-1996 - CEO at Directorate of the International Festival "Tavria Games."
 1996-2000 - President of JSC "Tavria Games."
 February 1998 - October 2000 - Secretary of Presidential Expert Council of Manufacturers and Entrepreneurs.
 June 2000 - May 2002 - Member of the National Presidential Council on Television and Radio Broadcasting of Ukraine.
 Since 2014 - President of "Tavria Games"; Chairman of the Supervisory Board of "Tavria Media" radio unit.

Nikolay Bagrayev is a businessman in mass media and show business. Founder and Honorary President of the festivals "Tavria Games" (founded in 1992) and "Black Sea Games" (1998).

Politics 
 June 2002 - April 2006 - Secretary of Verkhovna Rada Committee on freedom of speech and information.
 June 2006 - June 2007 - Chairman of the Subcommittee on electronic media and ICT systems, Verkhovna Rada Committee on freedom of speech and information.
 Since December 2007 - Member of Verkhovna Rada Committee on freedom of speech and information.
 Since May 2006 - Member of the fraction of Yulia Tymoshenko Bloc.
 December 2007 - March 2010 - Advisor to the Prime Minister of Ukraine (as a public service).
 Member of the Committee of the Ministry of Culture and Tourism of Ukraine.
 Member of the Group for Interparliamentary Relations with Russia.

Nikolay Bagrayev was the People's Deputy of Ukraine in the 4th, 5th, and 6th convocations of Verkhovna Rada. Although elected for the pro-European Bloc Yulia Tymoshenko (and at the time member of the All-Ukrainian Union "Fatherland") in March 2012, he became a member of the faction of the pro-Russian Party of Regions in March 2012, despite having been one of the architects of Yulia Tymoshenko's election campaign during the Ukrainian presidential elections of 2010.

In 2012 he was re-elected into parliament on the party list of the Party of Regions (number 51 on the list).

Bagrayev was among MPs from the ruling Party of Regions and the Communist Party who voted in favour of ten Ukrainian anti-protest laws restricting freedom of speech and freedom of assembly. This was described in the media and by experts as "draconian," with Timothy Snyder claiming that they effectively established the nation as a dictatorship.

Bagrayev did not stand in the 2014 Ukrainian parliamentary election.

He founded the group of companies representing Ukraine in the media music channels M1, M2, and "ТАВP Media," which includes Russkoe Radio Ukraina, Khit FM, Kiss FM, Radio Roks, Radio Melodiya, and Radio Relax.

Awards 
 Honored Artist of Ukraine (1997); 
 Order "For Merit" III Art. (2004); 
 Honorary citizen of Kakhovka.

See also 
 List of Ukrainian Parliament Members 2007
 Verkhovna Rada

References

External links 
 "Tavria Games" company official webpage
 Президент компанії «Таврійські Ігри» Микола Баграєв: Гала-концерт до Дня Незалежності України
 Україномовні пісні «Хіт-конвеєру» на М2 від Миколи Баграєва
 М. Г. Баграєв на сайті «Відкрита Україна»
 Баграев: Квоты для украинских песен
 Н.Баграев: «Административным путем невозможно „включить“ качество исполнителей»
 Н.Баграев: «Таврийские Игры» стали слишком дорогим удовольствием
 Николай Баграев: «Критерий нашей премии один — популярность исполнителя у зрителей»
 Николай Баграев – о новом руководстве М1 и М2 и регуляторных надеждах телеиндустрии
 Ко Дню Независимости Украины прошел гала-концерт и финал конкурса "Хит-конвейер"
 ЭКСКЛЮЗИВ! AFTER PARTY M1 MUSIC AWARDS 2016
 На церемонії M1 Music Awards роздали статуетки кращим артистам року, а ініціатор премії – Микола Баграєв – анонсував проведення третьої церемонії у 2017 році

1964 births
Living people
People from Digorsky District
Kyiv National Economic University alumni
Ukrainian media executives
All-Ukrainian Union "Fatherland" politicians
Party of Regions politicians
Fourth convocation members of the Verkhovna Rada
Fifth convocation members of the Verkhovna Rada
Sixth convocation members of the Verkhovna Rada
Seventh convocation members of the Verkhovna Rada
Russian people of Ossetian descent
Russian emigrants to Ukraine
Recipients of the Order of Merit (Ukraine), 3rd class